Zanthoxylum brachyacanthum, known as thorny yellow-wood, satinwood, satin tree or scrub mulga, is a species of flowering plant in the family Rutaceae and is endemic to north-eastern Australia. It is a rainforest shrub or tree with thick, cone-shaped spines on the trunk and prickles on the branches, pinnate leaves, and male and female flowers arranged in panicles.

Description
Zanthoxylum brachyacanthum is a shrub or tree that typically grows to a height of  usually with prickles on the branches and thick, cone-shaped spines on the trunk and older branches.

Taxonomy
Zanthoxylum brachyacanthum was first formally described in 1857 by Ferdinand von Mueller in Transactions of the Philosophical Institute of Victoria from specimens collected in "the Araucaria forests of Moreton Bay". 

Zanthoxylum veneficum, listed as a synonym of Z. brachyacanthum by the Australian Plant Census, is recognised as a different species in Queensland.

Distribution and habitat
This tree grows on a variety of subtropical, tropical and drier rainforests, often on volcanic soils. Young trees are easily identified in the rainforest by the thorny trunk.
The natural range is from the Clarence River (29° S) in New South Wales to tropical Queensland in the Eungella National Park and the Wet Tropics region.

Ecology
The leaves of Zanthoxylum brachyacanthum serve as a food plant for butterfly larvae including those of the orchard swallowtail butterfly, the fuscus swallowtail and Papilio polyctor.

Uses
This tree's small size, the interesting trunk, the attractive flowers and foliage makes the thorny yellowwood a candidate ornamental plant. The timber is deep yellow and close grained, and thus it might be suitable for decorative work.

The plant family contains some interesting alkaloids, coumarins, furanocoumarins, and pyranocoumarins, acetophenones such as Zantholoxylin, flavanoids like amurensin, and polyhydroxol flavanoids, and Amides.

The essential (leaf) oil of Z. brachyacanthum was rich in α-pinene (46%), β-caryophyllene (14%) and bicyclogermacrene (12.5%).

References

 Floyd, A.G., Rainforest Trees of Mainland South-eastern Australia, Inkata Press 1989, 

brachyacanthum
Flora of New South Wales
Flora of Queensland
Sapindales of Australia
Trees of Australia
Taxa named by Ferdinand von Mueller
Plants described in 1857